Monophysitism ( or ) or monophysism is a Christological term derived from the Greek  ("alone, solitary") and  (a word that has many meanings but in this context means "nature"). It is defined as "a doctrine that in the person of the incarnated Word (that is, in Jesus Christ) there was only one nature—the divine".

Background 

The First Council of Nicaea (325) declared that Christ was divine (homoousios, consubstantial, of one being or essence, with the Father) and human (was incarnate and became man). In the fifth century a heated controversy arose between the sees and theological schools of Antioch and Alexandria about how divinity and humanity existed in Christ, the former stressing the humanity, the latter the divinity of Christ. Cyril of Alexandria succeeded in having Nestorius, a prominent exponent of the Antiochian school, condemned at the Council of Ephesus in 431, and insisted on the formula "one physis of the incarnate Word", claiming that any formula that spoke of two physeis represented Nestorianism. Some taught that in Christ the human nature was completely absorbed by the divine, leaving only a divine nature. In 451, the Council of Chalcedon, on the basis of Pope Leo the Great's 449 declaration, defined that in Christ there were two natures united in one person.

Those who insisted on the "one physis" formula, Miaphysites, were referred to as Monophysites, while those who accepted the Chalcedonian "two natures" definition were called Dyophysites, a term applied also to followers of Nestorianism.

Groups called monophysite 

The forms of monophysism were numerous, and included the following:
 Acephali were Monophysites who in 482 broke away from Peter III of Alexandria who made an agreement with Acacius of Constantinople, sanctioned by Emperor Zeno with his Henotikon edict that condemned both Nestorius and Eutyches, as the Council of Chalcedon had done, but ignored that council's decree on the two natures of Christ. They saw this as a betrayal of S. Cyrils use of "Mia Physis" and refused to be subject to the Chalcedonian Patriarch of Alexandria, preferring to be instead ecclesiastically "without a head" (the meaning of acephali). For this, they were known as Headless Ones.
 Agnoetae, Themistians or Agnosticists, founded by Themistius Calonymus around 534, held that the nature of Jesus Christ, although divine, was like other men's in all respects, including limited knowledge. They must be distinguished from a fourth-century group called by the same name, who denied that God knew the past and the future.
 Aphthartodocetae, Phantasiasts or, after their leader Julian of Halicarnassus, Julianists believed "that the body of Christ, from the very moment of his conception, was incorruptible, immortal and impassible, as it was after the resurrection, and held that the suffering and death on the cross was a miracle contrary to the normal conditions of Christ's humanity". Emperor Justinian I wished to have this teaching adopted as orthodox, but died before he could put his plans into effect.
 Apollinarians or Apollinarists, named after Apollinaris of Laodicea (who died in 390) proposed that Jesus had a normal human body but had a divine mind instead of a regular human soul. This teaching was condemned by the First Council of Constantinople (381) and died out within a few decades. Cyril of Alexandria declared it a mad proposal.
 Docetists, not all of whom were Monophysites, held that Jesus had no human nature: his humanity was only a phantasm, which, united with the impassible, immaterial divine nature, could not really suffer and die.
 Eutychians taught that Jesus had only one nature, a union of the divine and human that is not an even compound, since what is divine is infinitely larger than what is human: the humanity is absorbed by and transmuted into the divinity, as a drop of honey, mixing with the water of the sea, vanishes. The body of Christ, thus transmuted, is not consubstantial homoousios with humankind. In contrast to Severians, who are called verbal Monophysites, Eutychianists are called real or ontological Monophysites, and their teaching is "an extreme form of the Monophysite heresy that emphasizes the exclusive prevalence of the divinity in Christ".
 Severians accepted the reality of Christ's human nature to the extent of insisting that his body was capable of corruption, but argued that, since a single person has a single nature and Christ was one person, not two, he had only a single nature. Agreeing in substance, though not in words, with the Definition of Chalcedon, Severians are known also as verbal Monophysites.
 Tritheists, a group of sixth-century Monophysites said to have been founded by a Monophysite named John Ascunages of Antioch. Their principal writer was John Philoponus, who taught that the common nature of Father, Son and Holy Spirit is an abstraction of their distinct individual natures.
 The early Coptic Orthodox Church believed in Monophysitism.

Verbal monophysitism

Concerning verbal declarations of Monophysitism, Justo L. González stated, "in order not to give an erroneous idea of the theology of the so-called Monophysite churches, that have subsisted until the twentieth century, one should point out that all the extreme sects of Monophysism disappeared within a brief span, and that the Christology of the present so-called Monophysite churches is closer to a verbal than to a real Monophysism".

Political situation of monophysitism after Chalcedon 

Under Emperor Basiliscus, who ousted Emperor Zeno in 475, "the Monophysites reached the pinnacle of their power". In his Encyclion, which he issued in the same year, he revoked the Council of Chalcedon and recognized the Second Council of Ephesus of 449 except for its approval of Eutyches, whom Basiliscus condemned. He required his edict to be signed by each bishop. Among the signatures he obtained were those of three of the four Eastern Patriarchs, but the Patriarch and the populace of the capital protested so resolutely that in 476, seeing that his overthrow was imminent, he issued his Anti-Encyclion revoking his former edict. In the same year, Zeno returned victoriously.

Events had made it clear that there was a split between the population, staunchly Chalcedonian in sympathies, of Constantinople and the Balkans and the largely anti-Chalcedonian population of Egypt and Syria. In an attempt to reconcile both sides, Zeno, with the support of Acacius of Constantinople and Peter III of Alexandria, tried to enforce the compromise Henoticon (Formula of Union) decree of 482, which condemned Eutyches but ignored Chalcedon. Schisms followed on both sides. Rome excommunicated Acacius (leading to the 35-year Acacian schism), while in Egypt the Acephali broke away from Peter III. The Acacian schism continued under Zeno's successor, the Monophysite Anastasius I Dicorus and ended only with the accession of the Chalcedonian Justin I in 518.

Justin I was succeeded by the Chalcedonian Justinian I (527–565), whose wife, however, the Empress Theodora, protected and assisted the Monophysites. Ghassanid patronage of the Monophysite Syrian Church during this time, under phylarch Al-Harith ibn Jabalah, was crucial for its survival and revival, and even its spread. Justinian I was followed by Justin II, who, after being, perhaps because of Theodora's influence, a Monophysite, converted to the Chalcedonian faith before obtaining the imperial throne. Some time later, he adopted a policy of persecuting the Monophysites. From Justinian I on, no emperor was a declared Monophysite, although they continued their efforts to find compromise formulas such as monoenergism and monothelitism.

References 

Christian terminology
Christianity in the Byzantine Empire
Christianity in the Middle East
Heresy in Christianity
Schisms in Christianity
Nature of Jesus Christ